Chelostoma is a genus of bees in the Osmiini tribe of the family Megachilidae. The genus is divided into 5 subgenera with at least 60 described species.

Species
These 60 species belong to the genus Chelostoma:

 Chelostoma aegaeicum Muller, 2012 g
 Chelostoma aureocinctum (Bingham, 1897) i c g
 Chelostoma bernardinum Michener, 1938 i c g
 Chelostoma bytinskii (Mavromoustakis, 1948) i c g
 Chelostoma californicum Cresson, 1878 i c g b
 Chelostoma campanularum (Kirby, 1802) i c g b
 Chelostoma carinocaudatum Wu, 2004 i c g
 Chelostoma carinoclypeatum Wu, 1992 i c g
 Chelostoma carinulum Pérez, 1895 i c g
 Chelostoma clypeale Muller g
 Chelostoma cockerelli Michener, 1938 i c g
 Chelostoma comosum g
 Chelostoma confusum (Benoist, 1934) i c g
 Chelostoma diodon Schletterer, 1889 i c g
 Chelostoma distinctum (Stoeckhert, 1929) i c g
 Chelostoma dolosum (Benoist, 1935) i c g
 Chelostoma edentulum Pérez, 1895 i c g
 Chelostoma emarginatum (Nylander, 1856) i c g
 Chelostoma florisomne (Linnaeus, 1758) i c g
 Chelostoma forcipatum (Benoist, 1928) i c g
 Chelostoma foveolatum (Morawitz, 1868) i c g
 Chelostoma galeridum (Warncke, 1991) i c g
 Chelostoma garrulum (Warncke, 1991) i c g
 Chelostoma grande (Nylander, 1852) i c g
 Chelostoma handlirschi Schletterer, 1889 i c g
 Chelostoma hebraeum (Benoist, 1935) i c g
 Chelostoma hellenicum (Benoist, 1938) i c g
 Chelostoma incertum Pérez, 1890 i c g
 Chelostoma incisulum Michener, 1938 i c g
 Chelostoma incognitum g
 Chelostoma isabellinum (Warncke, 1991) i c g
 Chelostoma josefi Schwarz & Gusenleitner, 2000 i c g
 Chelostoma lamellum Wu, 1992 i c g
 Chelostoma laticaudum (Benoist, 1938) i c g
 Chelostoma longifacies g
 Chelostoma longilabrare Wu, 2004 i c g
 Chelostoma lucens (Benoist, 1928) i c g
 Chelostoma maidli (Benoist, 1935) i c g
 Chelostoma marginatum Michener, 1938 i c g
 Chelostoma minutum Crawford, 1916 i c g
 Chelostoma mocsaryi Schletterer, 1889 i c g
 Chelostoma nasutum Pérez, 1895 i c g
 Chelostoma orientale Schletterer, 1890 i c g
 Chelostoma palaestinum (Benoist, 1935) i c g
 Chelostoma petersi (Tkalcu, 1984) i c g
 Chelostoma phaceliae Michener, 1938 i c g
 Chelostoma philadelphi (Robertson, 1891) i c g b
 Chelostoma proximum Schletterer, 1889 i c g
 Chelostoma rapunculi (Lepeletier, 1841) i c g b
 Chelostoma schlettereri (Friese, 1899) i c g
 Chelostoma siciliae g
 Chelostoma styriacum Schwarz & Gusenleitner, 1999 i c g
 Chelostoma sublamellum Wu, 1992 i c g
 Chelostoma subnitidum (Benoist, 1935) i c g
 Chelostoma tetramerum Michener, 1942 i c g
 Chelostoma tonsum Muller g
 Chelostoma torquillum (Warncke, 1991) i c g
 Chelostoma transversum (Friese, 1897) i c g
 Chelostoma ventrale Schletterer, 1889 i c g
 Chelostoma xizangense Wu, 1982 i c g

Data sources: i = ITIS, c = Catalogue of Life, g = GBIF, b = Bugguide.net

References

Bee genera
Megachilidae